
Year 854 (DCCCLIV) was a common year starting on Monday (link will display the full calendar) of the Julian calendar.

Events 
 By place 
 Europe 
 Emperor Lothair I meets his (half) brothers (Louis the German and Charles the Bald) in Attigny, Ardennes for the third time, to continue the system of "con-fraternal government".
 Viking chieftains Rorik and Godfrid Haraldsson return to Denmark, to gain power after the death of King Horik I. During a civil war, they are forced to go back to Friesland.
 The German city of Ulm is first mentioned, in a document by Louis the German. 
 Croatian–Bulgarian battle: Bulgarian Khan (later Knyaz) Boris I, attacks the Duchy of Littoral Croatia, ruled by Duke Trpimir I during the First Croatian-Bulgarian War. It is fought on the Croatian territory in the vicinity of the Croatian–Bulgarian border in present-day northeastern Bosnia and Herzegovina. None of warring sides emerges victorious, Bulgarian forces retreat and finally both parties subsequently conclude a peace treaty.
 
 Britain 
 King Æthelwulf of Wessex sends his two youngest sons, Alfred and Æthelred, on a pilgrimage to Rome.
 King Æthelweard of East Anglia dies, and is succeeded by his 14-year-old son Edmund ("the Martyr").
 King Cyngen of Powys makes the first pilgrimage to Rome of a Welsh ruler.  
 Viking chieftain Ubba winters in Milford Haven (Wales) with 23 ships.
 By topic 
 Religion 
 Eardulf becomes bishop of Lindisfarne, after the death of Eanbert.

Births 
 Al-Mu'tadid, Muslim caliph (or 861)
 Cadell ap Rhodri, king of Seisyllwg (d. 909)
 Cui Yin, chancellor of the Tang Dynasty (d. 904)
 Theobald the Elder, Frankish nobleman (d. 942)

Deaths 
 Abu Thawr, Muslim scholar (b. 764)
 Æthelweard, king of East Anglia
 Eanbert, bishop of Lindisfarne 
 Horik I, Viking king of Denmark
 Luidger, bishop of Utrecht (approximate date)
 Osburh, queen of Wessex (approximate date)
 Sahnun ibn Sa'id, Muslim jurist (or 855)
 Túathal mac Máele-Brigte, king of Leinster
 Wang Yuankui, Chinese general (b. 812)
 Wigmund, archbishop of York

References